Japanese recording duo Ali Project have released seventeen studio albums, twelve compilation albums, one extended play, twenty-one singles, five video albums, nine soundtrack albums, and eight strings albums.

Albums

Studio albums

Compilation albums

Extended plays

Video albums

Soundtrack albums

Strings albums

Singles

References

Discographies of Japanese artists